George Julius Brockman (2 January 1850 – 29 August 1912) was a prominent explorer and pastoralist in the Gascoyne and Kimberley regions of Western Australia.

Born in 1850 at Guildford, George was the seventh son of Robert Brockman and brother of Charles Samuel Brockman. Brockman's father was a settler in the Lake Bamban district near Gingin. The family moved to Mimigarra, near Moore River while Brockman was still a boy then later to a property on the Greenough River.

Brockman left home at 16 years of age and rode south to Busselton and eventually took a job on Henty station near Bunbury.

The May River and Meda River were named in 1881 by Brockman during an expedition in the Kimberley area looking for grazing land north of the Fitzroy River. He named the Meda is named after HMS Meda, an Admiralty surveying vessel that charted the coastline in the area including the river mouth in 1880. after the granddaughter of John Septimus Roe, Mary Matilda (May) Thomson. He stocked the property with 1,100 ewes which suffered through drought followed by floods.

Brockman acquired the  Minilya Station in 1884 for £15,000, from his brother. The property was struck by drought in 1890, then a lean season in 1891. By 1893 good rains meant good feed and plentiful water with Brockman selling plenty of stock. Drought came again in 1895 and 1896 reducing his flock of sheet from 12,500 and his cattle from 3,000 to 10. and remained there until 1902, then selling the property to Mr. D. N. McLeod. He then travelled and bought a property in Guildford.

Brockman died on 29 August 1912 in Geraldton.

References 

1850 births
Australian pastoralists
1912 deaths
19th-century Australian businesspeople